Thomas William Baxter (1 February 1903 – 21 August 1987) was an English footballer who played on the left wing for Welbeck Colliery, Newark Town, Worksop Town, Mansfield Town, Wolverhampton Wanderers, Port Vale, Margate, Carlisle United, and Distillery. He helped the "Valiants" to win the Third Division North title in 1929–30.

Career
Baxter played amateur football for Welbeck Colliery, Newark Town and Worksop Town (Midland League). He began his professional career with his hometown club Mansfield Town. He moved to Second Division club Wolverhampton Wanderers in late 1927, and made his "Wolves" debut on 17 December 1927 in a 2–0 defeat to Chelsea at Stamford Bridge. He remained in the team for the remainder of the 1927–28 season and played the majority of the 1928–29 campaign. An attacking player, he scored 15 goals in a total of 53 appearances for the Midlanders. He left Molineux to join Port Vale in August 1929.

He was a regular member of the "Valiants" 1929–30 Third Division North winning side, claiming nine goals in 43 appearances. He lost his first team place in December 1930, and featured in just 16 games of the 1930–31 season, as the Vale achieved a club record high of fifth in the Second Division. He left The Old Recreation Ground at the end of the campaign and returned to Mansfield. He later spent two spells with Margate and also played for Carlisle United and Distillery (Irish League).

Career statistics
Source:

Honours
Port Vale
 Football League Third Division North: 1929–30

References

1903 births
1987 deaths
Footballers from Mansfield
English footballers
Association football outside forwards
Welbeck Welfare F.C. players
Newark Town F.C. players
Worksop Town F.C. players
Mansfield Town F.C. players
Wolverhampton Wanderers F.C. players
Port Vale F.C. players
Margate F.C. players
Carlisle United F.C. players
Lisburn Distillery F.C. players
Midland Football League players
English Football League players